A version vector is a mechanism for tracking changes to data in a distributed system, where multiple agents might update the data at different times. The version vector allows the participants to determine if one update preceded another (happened-before), followed it, or if the two updates happened concurrently (and therefore might conflict with each other). In this way, version vectors enable causality tracking among data replicas and are a basic mechanism for optimistic replication.  In mathematical terms, the version vector generates a preorder that tracks the events that precede, and may therefore influence, later updates.

Version vectors maintain state identical to that in a vector clock, but the update rules differ slightly;  in this example, replicas can either experience local updates (e.g., the user editing a file on the local node), or can synchronize with another replica:

 Initially all vector counters are zero.
 Each time a replica experiences a local update event, it increments its own counter in the vector by one.
 Each time two replicas  and  synchronize, they both set the elements in their copy of the vector to the maximum of the element across both counters:  .  After synchronization, the two replicas have identical version vectors.

Pairs of replicas, can be compared by inspecting their version vectors and determined to be either: identical, concurrent, or ordered ( or ).

Version vectors or variants are used to track updates in many distributed file systems, such as  Coda (file system) and Ficus, and are the main data structure behind optimistic replication.

Other mechanisms
 Hash Histories  avoid the use of counters by keeping a set of hashes of each updated version and comparing those sets by set inclusion. However this mechanism can only give probabilistic guarantees.
 Concise Version Vectors  allow significant space savings when handling multiple replicated items, such as in directory structures in filesystems.
 Version Stamps  allow tracking of a variable number of replicas and do not resort to counters. This mechanism can depict scalability problems in some settings, but can be replaced by Interval Tree Clocks.
 Interval Tree Clocks generalize version vectors and vector clocks and allows dynamic numbers of replicas/processes.
 Bounded Version Vectors   allow a bounded implementation, with bounded size counters, as long as replica pairs can be atomically synchronized.
 Dotted Version Vectors  address scalability with a small set of servers mediating replica access by a large number of concurrent clients.

References

External links 
 Why Logical Clocks are Easy (Compares Causal Histories, Vector Clocks and Version Vectors)

Data synchronization
Logical clock algorithms
Distributed computing problems
Causality